Emmanuel "EJ" Johnson (born May 11, 2003) is an American soccer player who currently plays for MLS Next Pro side Austin FC II, on loan from Hibernian. He has previously played on loan at USL Championship team Charleston Battery and Edinburgh.

Youth career
Emmanuel "EJ" Johnson played club soccer with Northbay Elite FC, before joining the Sacramento Republic academy in 2016, where he went on to make 90 appearances across various age group competitions through to 2020, tallying 29 goals in that time. In April 2021, Johnson signed a USL academy contract with Sacramento, making him eligible for the club's first-team in the USL Championship. Johnson joined the Barça Residency Academy in the United States in August 2021, before verbally committing to play college soccer at the University of California, Berkeley in 2022.

Professional career

Hibernian
On February 10, 2022, Johnson signed a three-and-a-half year deal with Scottish Premiership club Hibernian. After signing with Hibernian, Johnson was immediately loaned to USL Championship side Charleston Battery for their 2022 season. 

Johnson made his professional debut with Charleston on March 12, 2022, appearing as a 64th–minute substitute during a 1–0 victory over FC Tulsa. On June 4, 2022, Johnson scored his first professional goal for Charleston against Indy Eleven. After securing a UK work permit, Johnson was recalled by Hibernian and ended his loan with the Battery on June 16, 2022.

Johnson was recalled from his loan to Charleston Battery in June 2022, as he obtained a UK work permit and was added to the Hibs development squad. He was then loaned to Scottish League One club Edinburgh in July 2022. On 31 January 2023, Johnson changed his loan club, this time returning to the US to join MLS Next Pro side Austin FC II, the reserve team of Austin FC. Austin retained an option to make the move permanent.

Career statistics

References 

Living people
2003 births
American expatriates in Scotland
American soccer players
Association football forwards
Charleston Battery players
Expatriate footballers in Scotland
Hibernian F.C. players
People from Fairfield, California
Sacramento Republic FC players
Soccer players from California
USL Championship players
F.C. Edinburgh players